Manahati Lestusen (born 17 December 1993  in Liang, South Buru) is an Indonesian professional footballer who plays for Liga 1 club Persikabo 1973. A versatile defensive player, Lestusen has been deployed as a defensive midfielder, a centre back and a right back.

Personal life
Lestusen hails from  Liang, Buru and is the son of H. Muhabas Lestusen and Janiapari. He started playing football at the age of 13 and played every position on his school team. He is also a First Sergeant in the Army Military Police Corps (Indonesia).

International career 
Lestusen won his first cap for Indonesia in a friendly match against Andorra on 26 March 2014, replacing Rizky Pellu after 46 minutes.

Career statistics

Club

International

International goal
International goals

Honours

International
Indonesia U-23
 Islamic Solidarity Games  Silver medal: 2013
 Southeast Asian Games  Silver medal: 2013
Indonesia
 AFF Championship runner-up: 2016

References

External links 
 
 Manahati Lestusen at S.A.D Indonesia 

1993 births
Sportspeople from Maluku (province)
Indonesian Muslims
Indonesian footballers
Association football midfielders
Indonesia international footballers
Indonesia youth international footballers
Indonesian expatriate footballers
Expatriate footballers in Belgium
Indonesian expatriate sportspeople in Belgium
Challenger Pro League players
C.S. Visé players
Liga 1 (Indonesia) players
Bhayangkara F.C. players
PS Barito Putera players
Persikabo 1973 players
Footballers at the 2014 Asian Games
Southeast Asian Games silver medalists for Indonesia
Southeast Asian Games medalists in football
Competitors at the 2013 Southeast Asian Games
Asian Games competitors for Indonesia
Living people